Your Face Sounds Familiar is a Greek reality show airing on ANT1. The sixth season premiered on February 16, 2020. This season marks the second consecutive season that the show is filmed and not live.

On March 22, 2020, Maria Bekatorou announced on her Instagram that the show will stop airing, because of the coronavirus pandemic in Greece and that she don't know when will they return. On May 14, 2020, Bekatorou announced on the morning show of ANT1, that the season will return in September 2020. In October 2020, it was announced that the show will return in 2021 with new contestants.

Cast

Host and judges
Maria Bekatorou returned to host the show for the sixth time and the judges are Giorgos Mazonakis, Dimitris Starovas, Alexis Georgoulis and Mirka Papakonstantinou, which replaced Mimi Denisi.

Contestants
Ten contestants in total competed in the fifth season; five women and five men:

Weekly results

Week 1
The premiere aired on February 16, 2020 and the winner was Tania with 21 points. Tania chose to give the money from the audience voting to the organization "Save A Greek Stray".

After the combined final scores, two contestants had 21 points and other three contestants had 13 points. The one who got the highest score from the audience got the highest final place and the one with the lowest got the lowest place.

Notes
 1.  The points that judges gave in order (Georgoulis, Papakonstantinou, Mazonakis,  Starovas).
 2.  Each contestant gave 5 points to a contestant of their choice.
 3.  Total of both extra and judges' score.
 4.  Result of both extra and judges' score.

Week 2
The second episode aired on February 23, 2020 and the winner was Maria with 23 points. Maria chose to give the money from the audience voting to the organization "KEEPEA Orizodes".

After the judges and contestants' scores, Maria and Katerina were tied with 40 points and Ilias and Tania were tied with 27 points. Mazonakis, who was the president of the judges for the week, chose to give the final 11 points to Maria and the 10 points to Katerina and chose to give the 9 points to Ilias and the 8 points to Tania. After the combined final scores, two contestants had 15 points, other two contestants had 14 points and other two contestants had 7 points. The one who got the highest score from the audience got the highest final place and the one with the lowest got the lowest place.

Alexis Georgoulis, was missing from this episode because he had a professional job abroad.

Notes
 5.  The points that judges gave in order (Papakonstantinou, Mazonakis,  Starovas).
 6.  Each contestant gave 5 points to a contestant of their choice.
 7.  Total of both extra and judges' score.
 8.  Result of both extra and judges' score.

Week 3
The third episode aired on March 1, 2020 and the winner was Lambis with 23 points. Lambis chose to give the money from the audience voting to the organization "I Kivotos tou Kosmou".

After the combined final scores, two contestants had 19 points and other two contestants had 7 points. The one who got the highest score from the audience got the highest final place and the one with the lowest got the lowest place.

Notes
 9.  The points that judges gave in order (Georgoulis, Papakonstantinou, Mazonakis,  Starovas).
 10.  Each contestant gave 5 points to a contestant of their choice.
 11.  Total of both extra and judges' score.
 12.  Result of both extra and judges' score.

Week 4
The fourth episode aired on March 8, 2020 and the winner was Evridiki with 24 points. Evridiki chose to give the money from the audience voting to the organization "PASYKAF".

After the judges and contestants' scores, Nikolas and Stefanos were tied with 37 points. Georgoulis, who was the president of the judges for the week, chose to give the final 9 points to Stefanos and the 8 points to Nikolas. After the combined final scores, two contestants had 20 points. The one who got the highest score from the audience got the highest final place and the one with the lowest got the lowest place.

Notes
 13.  The points that judges gave in order (Georgoulis, Papakonstantinou, Mazonakis,  Starovas).
 14.  Each contestant gave 5 points to a contestant of their choice.
 15.  Total of both extra and judges' score.
 16.  Result of both extra and judges' score.

Week 5
The fifth episode aired on March 15, 2020 and the winner was Katerina with 23 points. Evridiki chose to give the money from the audience voting to the organization "Kentro Vrefon Mitera".

After the judges and contestants' scores, Ilias and Yiorgos were tied with 34 points. Georgoulis, who was the president of the judges for the week, chose to give the final 7 points to Ilias and the 6 points to Yiorgos. After the combined final scores, two contestants had 20 points and other twocontestants had 9 points. The one who got the highest score from the audience got the highest final place and the one with the lowest got the lowest place.

Notes
 17.  The points that judges gave in order (Georgoulis, Papakonstantinou, Mazonakis,  Starovas).
 18.  Each contestant gave 5 points to a contestant of their choice.
 19.  Total of both extra and judges' score.
 20.  Result of both extra and judges' score.

Week 6
The sixth episode aired on March 22, 2020 and the winner was Nikolas with 24 points. Nikolas chose to give the money from the audience voting to the organization "Sophia Foundation". The episode was filmed, for the first time, without audience due to the COVID-19 pandemic. The audience vote was replaced by the president of the judges' vote.

After the judges and contestants' scores, Ilias, Maria and Yiorgos were tied with 20 points. Papakonstantinou, who was the president of the judges for the week, chose to give the final 6 points to Yiorgos, the 5 points to Ilias and the 4 points to Maria.

Notes
 21.  The points that judges gave in order (Georgoulis, Mazonakis,  Starovas).
 22.  Each contestant gave 5 points to a contestant of their choice.
 23.  Total of both extra and judges' score.
 24.  Result of both extra and judges' score.

Results chart 

 indicates the contestant came first that week.
 indicates the contestant came last that week.

Performances 

 indicates the contestant came first that week.
 indicates the contestant came last that week.
 show discontinued

Ratings

References

External links
 Official website of Your Face Sounds Familiar
 Facebook page of Your Face Sounds Familiar
 Twitter of Your Face Sounds Familiar

Greek 6
2020 Greek television seasons